The Moomba to Sydney Pipeline is two parallel pipelines sharing for most of the route the same 40' wide easement from Moomba, South Australia to Sydney.  The pipeline, owned by the APA Group is over 2,000 km long.  The pipeline is part of an East Coast gas grid network which covers various southern energy markets in Australia.

The Moomba to Sydney Natural Gas Pipeline carries natural gas.

The Moomba to Sydney Ethane Pipeline carries ethane.

References

External links
 https://www.pipeliner.com.au/2016/03/16/the-moomba-to-sydney-ethane-pipeline

Natural gas pipelines in Australia
Transport buildings and structures in New South Wales
Pipelines in South Australia